Kunovo is a rural locality (a village) in Kubenskoye Rural Settlement, Vologodsky District, Vologda Oblast, Russia. The population was 8 as of 2002.

Geography 
Kunovo is located 73 km northwest of Vologda (the district's administrative centre) by road. Dekteri is the nearest rural locality.
it is named because of the monetary unit of kuna Rus of the 13th century and modern Croatia

References 

Rural localities in Vologodsky District